Alexander Alexandrovich Blok (7 August 1921) was a Russian lyrical poet, writer, publicist, playwright, translator and literary critic.

Early life 
Blok was born in Saint Petersburg, into an intellectual family of Alexander Lvovich Blok and Alexandra Andreevna Beketova. His father was a law professor in Warsaw, and his maternal grandfather, Andrey Beketov, was a famous botanist and the rector of Saint Petersburg State University. After his parents' separation, Blok lived with aristocratic relatives at the manor Shakhmatovo near Moscow, where he discovered the philosophy of Vladimir Solovyov, and the verse of then-obscure 19th-century poets, Fyodor Tyutchev and Afanasy Fet.  These influences would affect his early publications, later collected in the book Ante Lucem.

Career and marriage
In 1903 he married the actress Lyubov (Lyuba) Dmitrievna Mendeleeva, daughter of the renowned chemist Dmitri Mendeleev. Later, she would involve him in a complicated love-hate relationship with his fellow Symbolist Andrei Bely. To Lyuba he dedicated a cycle of poetry that made him famous, Stikhi o Prekrasnoi Dame (Verses About the Beautiful Lady, 1904).

Blok enthusiastically greeted the 1905 Russian Revolution. During the last period of his life, Blok emphasised political themes, pondering the messianic destiny of his country (Vozmezdie, 1910–21; Rodina, 1907–16; Skify, 1918). In 1906 he wrote an encomium to Mikhail Bakunin. Influenced by Solovyov's doctrines, he had vague apocalyptic apprehensions and often vacillated between hope and despair. "I feel that a great event was coming, but what it was exactly was not revealed to me", he wrote in his diary during the summer of 1917. Quite unexpectedly for most of his admirers, he accepted the October Revolution as the final resolution of these apocalyptic yearnings.

In May 1917 Blok was appointed as a stenographer for the Extraordinary Commission to investigate illegal actions ex officio Ministers or to transcribe the (Thirteenth Section's) interrogations of those who knew Grigori Rasputin. According to Orlando Figes he was only present at the interrogation.

When the Socialist Academy of Social Sciences was established in 1918, Blok became a participant.

Decline in health

By 1921 Blok had become disillusioned with the Russian Revolution. He had not written any poetry for three years. He complained to Maksim Gorky that his "faith in the wisdom of humanity" had ended, and explained to his friend Korney Chukovsky why he could not write poetry any more: "All sounds have stopped. Can't you hear that there are no longer any sounds?" Within a few days Blok became sick. His doctors requested that he be sent abroad for medical treatment, but he was not allowed to leave the country.

Gorky pleaded for a visa.  On 29 May 1921, he wrote to Anatoly Lunacharsky: "Blok is Russia's finest poet. If you forbid him to go abroad, and he dies, you and your comrades will be guilty of his death." A resolution on departure for Blok was signed by members of the Political Bureau of the Central Committee on 23 July 1921. But on 29 July Gorky asked permission for Blok's wife to accompany him, since Blok's health had deteriorated sharply. Permission for Liubov' Dmitrievna Blok to leave Russia was signed by Molotov on 1 August 1921, but Gorky was notified only on 6 August. The permission was delivered on 10 August, after Blok had already died.

Several months earlier, Blok had delivered a celebrated lecture on Alexander Pushkin, the memory of whom he believed to be capable of uniting White and Soviet Russian factions.

Work

The idealized mystical images presented in his first book helped establish Blok as a major poet of the Russian Symbolism style. Blok's early verse is musical, but he later sought to introduce daring rhythmic patterns and uneven beats into his poetry. Poetical inspiration was natural for him, often producing unforgettable, otherworldly images out of the most banal surroundings and trivial events (Fabrika, 1903). Consequently, his mature poems are often based on the conflict between the Platonic theory of ideal beauty and the disappointing reality of foul industrialism (The Puppet Show, 1906).

The description of St Petersburg he crafted for his next collection of poems, The City (1904–08), was both impressionistic and eerie. Subsequent collections, Faina and the Mask of Snow, helped augment Blok's reputation. He was often compared with Alexander Pushkin, and is considered perhaps the most important poet of the Silver Age of Russian Poetry. During the 1910s, Blok was admired greatly by literary colleagues, and his influence on younger poets was virtually unsurpassed. Anna Akhmatova, Marina Tsvetaeva, Boris Pasternak, and Vladimir Nabokov wrote important verse tributes to Blok.

Blok expressed his opinions about the revolution by the enigmatic poem "The Twelve” (1918). The long poem exhibits "mood-creating sounds, polyphonic rhythms, and harsh, slangy language" (as the Encyclopædia Britannica termed it). It describes the march of twelve  Bolshevik soldiers (likened to the Twelve Apostles of Christ) through the streets of revolutionary Petrograd, with a fierce winter blizzard raging around them. "The Twelve" alienated Blok from many of his intellectual readers (who accused him of lack of artistry), while the Bolsheviks scorned his former mysticism and asceticism.

Searching for modern language and new images, Blok used unusual sources for the poetry of Symbolism: urban folklore, ballads (songs of a sentimental nature) and ditties ("chastushka"). He was inspired by the popular chansonnier Mikhail Savoyarov, whose concerts during the years 1915–1920 were visited often by Blok.

Musical settings

 Dmitri Shostakovich wrote a late song cycle for soprano and piano trio, Seven Romances on Poems by Alexander Blok, Op. 127.
 Mieczysław Weinberg wrote a song cycle for soprano and piano, Beyond the Border of Past Days, Op. 50.
 Arthur Lourié wrote a choral cantata, In the Sanctuary of Golden Dreams.
 Alexander Blok was a favourite poet of Georgy Sviridov; such works as "Petersburg" (a vocal poem), "Nightly Clouds" (cantata) and "Songs From Hard Times" (concerto) were written to Blok's poetry.
Yevgania Yosifovna Yakhina set several of Blok's poems to music.

References

External links 

 
 
 Translations into English
 The Poems by Alexander Blok (with Russian originals, also some in German, French, Spanish, Italian, Dutch, Bulgarian, etc.)
 Collection of Alexander Blok's poems in English (with Russian originals)
 4 short poems, translated by Alex Cigale. University of Albany. Retrieved 2010-10-28
 A night, a street (Ноць, улица, фонарь, аптека) (archived at the Wayback Machine)
 Dark Maiden (Чёрная Дева)
 The Lady Unknown (Незнакомка), translation by Dina Belyayeva (archived at the Wayback Machine)
 Alexander Blok poetry (Russian texts)
 Reviews, criticism and analysis
 "Died and survived" review of new works published on Blok By Simon Karlinsky. 9 May 1982 The New York Times. Retrieved 2010-10-28
 Essay on Blok's poem "the Twelve", Maria Carlson, University of Kansas. Retrieved 2010-10-28
 Essay on Blok by Leon Trotsky (Chapter 3 of Literature and Revolution,  	1907—1923). Retrieved 2010-10-28
 Rykov A. Politics of Modernism. Nikolay Punin and Alexander Blok
 

1880 births
1921 deaths
Russian male poets
Russian symbolism
Symbolist dramatists and playwrights
Symbolist poets
Russian male dramatists and playwrights
20th-century dramatists and playwrights
20th-century Russian poets
20th-century Russian male writers